Jacob Eisner, also known as Jack Eisner (גיי'קוב (ג'ק) אייזנר; born December 18, 1947), is an Israeli former basketball player. He played the center position. He played in the Israel Basketball Premier League and for the Israeli national basketball team.

Biography
Eisner was born in Łódź, Poland. At 13 years of age he along with his family moved to the Cincinnati in the United States; he subsequently attended the University of Cincinnati. He later immigrated to Israel. He is 2.05 m  (6 ft 9 in) tall.

He played in the Israel Basketball Premier League for Beitar Jerusalem from 1971 to 1976.

Eisner also played for the Israeli national basketball team in the 1972 Pre-Olympic Basketball Tournament, 1973 European Championship for Men, 1975 European Championship for Men, and 1976 European Olympic Qualifying Tournament for Men.

References 

Living people
1947 births
Israeli men's basketball players
Israeli Basketball Premier League players
Sportspeople from Łódź
Polish men's basketball players
Basketball players from Cincinnati
Polish emigrants to the United States
Polish emigrants to Israel
University of Cincinnati alumni
Medalists at the 1974 Asian Games
Asian Games gold medalists for Israel
Asian Games medalists in basketball
Basketball players at the 1974 Asian Games